You Are What You Love is the third studio album by Juno Award winning Canadian singer-songwriter Melanie Doane. It was first released independently on February 14, 2003, via Melanie's official website and later distributed by Warner Music Canada to retail outlets in Canada on May 6, 2003.

Track listing
"Still Desire You" – 4:08
"As I Am" – 4:01
"Wilma Or A Betty Man" – 3:43
"Way Past Blue" – 4:10
"First Love" – 2:11
"You Are What You Love" – 3:59
"You Do The Math" – 4:18
"Mayor of Melonville" – 3:06
"Temporary" – 2:52
"Bionic" – 3:23
"Here I Am" – 4:36

Song placements
 Dawson's Creek – "Bionic"
 That's Life – "Way Past Blue", "Still Desire You", "You Are What You Love", "Bionic"
 Prom Queen: The Marc Hall Story (TV Movie) – "You Are What You Love"

More Information
 An alternate mix of "Bionic" appeared previously as a bonus track on Doane's 2001 live album Melvin Live.

2003 albums
Melanie Doane albums